Joe Reihsen is a painter and sculptor based in Los Angeles, California, U.S.

Biography

Reihsen was born in Blaine, Minnesota, U.S., in 1979. He currently lives and works in Los Angeles. He attended the San Francisco Art Institute, California, and received a BFA for painting and new genres in 2005, and a MFA at the University of California in Santa Barbara, California, in 2008. Reihsen founded JAM in 2003 for an exhibition at San Francisco's New Langton Arts.  The program was designed to help average people attain success with art.  JAM has traveled nationally, offering free workshops from 2003 until its final seminar at the University of California, Santa Barbara on September 19, 2006.

Reihsen uses a variety in thickness of paint to create textured abstract works which are simultaneously ethereal and dense.

Selected exhibitions 
 2015 The Armory Show, with Praz-Delavallade, New York, New York
 Joe Reihsen, Praz-Delavallade @ Vedovi, Brussels, BE
 2014 Factory Paint, Aftermarket Interior, Brand New Gallery, Milan, IT
 Aftermarket Interior, Factory Paint, Anat Ebgi, Los Angeles, California
 Solo presentation, Miart, Milan, IT
 2013 Solo presentation, UNTITLED Miami, Miami Beach, Florida
 Solo presentation, NADA New York 2013, New York, New York
 Clean Title No Accidents, Anat Ebgi, Los Angeles, California
 2011 Joe Reihsen, The Company, Los Angeles, California
 2009 Preview, The Company, Los Angeles, California
 2005 New Paintings, Artspace, San Francisco, California
 2004 Swamp Machine, Diego Rivera Gallery, San Francisco, California

Selected group exhibitions 
 2014 Camel Blues, Kinman Gallery, London, UK
 Next, curated by Jean-François Bélisle, Arsenal, Montreal, QC
 Forms of Abstraction, curated by Susanne Van Hagen, Dickinson, London, UK
 Blue, ALAC, Los Angeles, California
 2013 This is the story of America. Everybody’s doing what they think they’re supposed to do, Brand  New Gallery, Milano, IT
 Dallas Art Fair, with Anat Ebgi, Dallas, Texas
 Le Fil Rouge, curated by Lucie Fontaine, with Anat Ebgi, ALAC, Los Angeles, California
 2009 Invite, Circus Gallery, Los Angeles, California
 2007 Mr. Nice Guy & Helper Outer, Performance by foot and limousine in Miami, Galerie Nuke, Paris,  FR
 artLA with RFC, Los Angeles International Art Fair, Santa Monica Convention Center, Santa  Monica, California
 2006 Big Trouble in Little China. Mountain Bar, Los Angeles, California
 2005 First Try, Warehouse 1310, San Francisco, California
 Joseph Reihsen. ArtSpace Chicago, Chicago, Illinois
 Truck You, Public exhibition, Seventh and Folsom, San Francisco, California
 2003 Sliv and Dulet Presents: The Summer Line, New Langton Arts, San Francisco, California

External links 
 2014 Domenico de Chirico, “Joe Reihsen ‘Factory Paint, Aftermarket Interior’ at Brand New Gallery,”  Mousse magazine
 Ed Schad, “Two Worlds Colliding: Paintings in which analog and digital meet,” Modern Painters,  June 2014.
 2013 Ed Schad, “Joe Reihsen: Clean Titles, No Accidents,” ArtReview, June 2013.
 Hailey Lohman, “‘Clean Title, No Accidents’ by Joe Reihsen at Anat Ebgi Gallery, Los Angeles”,  San Francisco Arts Quarterly, April 2013.

References

Living people
American artists
1979 births
San Francisco Art Institute alumni